Miloslav Mečíř won in the final 6–3, 6–2, against Andrés Gómez.

Players

Draw

Finals

Group one
Standings are determined by: 1. number of wins; 2. number of matches; 3. in two-players-ties, head-to-head records; 4. in three-players-ties, percentage of sets won, or of games won; 5. steering-committee decision.

Group two
Standings are determined by: 1. number of wins; 2. number of matches; 3. in two-players-ties, head-to-head records; 4. in three-players-ties, percentage of sets won, or of games won; 5. steering-committee decision.

References

Eurocard Open
Exhibition tennis tournaments
1988 in German tennis
Tennis tournaments in Germany